Krystyna Skarżyńska may refer to:
 Krystyna Skarżyńska (psychologist), Polish psychologist and professor
 Krystyna Skarżyńska (geotechnical engineer), Polish geotechnical engineer and surveying engineer

See also
 Skarżyński